Isoliquiritigenin is a phenolic chemical compound found in licorice.

Metabolism
The enzyme 6'-deoxychalcone synthase uses malonyl-CoA, 4-coumaroyl-CoA, NADPH, and H+ to produce CoA, isoliquiritigenin, CO2, NADP+, and H2O.

The enzyme isoliquiritigenin 2'-O-methyltransferase further transforms isoliquiritigenin into 2'-O-methylisoliquiritigenin.

Mechanism of action
Isoliquiritigenin has been found to be a potent (65 times higher affinity than diazepam) GABA-A benzodiapine receptor positive allosteric modulator. It can target miR-301b/LRIG1 signaling pathways, resulting in the inhibition of melanoma growth in vitro.

References

Chalconoids
Phenols